In Greek mythology, Paroreus (Ancient Greek: Παρωρεὺς) was the youngest son of Tricolonus, son of the impious King Lycaon, and brother of Zoeteus. He was the reputed founder of the Arcadian town of Paroria.

Note

References 

 Pausanias, Description of Greece with an English Translation by W.H.S. Jones, Litt.D., and H.A. Ormerod, M.A., in 4 Volumes. Cambridge, MA, Harvard University Press; London, William Heinemann Ltd. 1918. . Online version at the Perseus Digital Library
 Pausanias, Graeciae Descriptio. 3 vols. Leipzig, Teubner. 1903. Greek text available at the Perseus Digital Library.

Characters in Greek mythology
Arcadian mythology